The LOGO Board Game is for 2 to 6 players (or teams) aged 12 and up. Players travel round the board of purple, yellow, green, and red spaces, based on correctly answered questions, until they reach the winning zone in the center.  The questions are based on logos, products and packaging of well-known brands.

There are three types of question card:
 Picture cards
 Pot luck cards
 Common theme cards
The game includes 1 playing board, 6 playing pieces, 400 cards containing 1,600 questions and rules.

The game was launched by Drumond Park in 2009, and was one of the three top selling adult games in the UK for that year, with Drumond Park’s Articulate and Rapidough taking the number 2 and 3 spots.

The game launched internationally in 2010 when it was nominated for the Toy of the Year in the Netherlands, and was awarded the “Grand Prix du Jouet – Jeu D’ambiance” in France.

There are other games which is The Logo Board Game but with a main theme including:

 The Best Of British 
 The Best Of TV & Movies
 The Best Of Christmas Game
 The Best Of Christmas Game (Not For Kids)
 The Best Of Food
 His & Hers
 Logo What Am I? (Aimed at a slightly younger audience)

In 2020 Drummond Park released The Logo Board Game Second Edition with all new and updated questions. It also features a new design but it has the exact same rules and concept of the first edition.

References

External links
 http://www.logogame.co.uk / – Official web site for The Logo Board Game
http://www.theboardgamers.co.uk/the-logo-board-game.html
Board games introduced in 2009